Ralph de Diceto (or Ralph of Diss; c. 1120c. 1202) was archdeacon of Middlesex, dean of St Paul's Cathedral (from c. 1180), and author of two chronicles, the Abbreviationes chronicorum and the Ymagines historiarum.

Early career
Ralph is first mentioned in 1152, when he received the archdeaconry of Middlesex. He was probably born between 1120 and 1130; of his parentage and nationality we know nothing. The common statement that he derived his surname from Diss in Norfolk is a mere conjecture. Dicetum may equally well be a Latinized form of Dissay, Dicy, or Dizy, place names in Maine, Picardy, Burgundy, and Champagne.

In 1152 Ralph was already a master of arts and, presumably, had studied at Paris. His reputation for learning and integrity stood high. He was regarded with respect and favor by Arnulf of Lisieux and Gilbert Foliot, two of the most eminent bishops of their time. Quite naturally, the archdeacon assumed the same side, that of King Henry II, on the Becket controversy  as did his friends.

By 1164 Ralph had acquired the livings of Aynho, Northamptonshire, and Finchingfield, Essex, and served them both by vicars.

Although Ralph's narrative is colourless and although he was one of those who showed some sympathy for Becket at the council of Northampton in 1164, his correspondence shows that he regarded the archbishop's conduct as ill-considered and that he gave advice to those whom Becket regarded as his chief enemies.

Ralph was selected in 1166 as the envoy of the English bishops when they protested against the excommunications launched by Becket. But, apart from this episode, which he characteristically neglects to record, he remained in the background. The natural impartiality of his intellect was accentuated by a certain timidity, which is apparent in his writings no less than in his life.

Dean of St Paul's
About 1180 Ralph became dean of St Paul's. In this office, he distinguished himself by careful management of the estates, by restoring the discipline of the chapter, and by building at his own expense a deanery house. A scholar and a man of considerable erudition, he evinced  a strong preference for historical studies; and about the time when he was preferred to the deanery he began to collect materials for the history of his own times.

Ralph's friendships with Richard Fitz Nigel, who succeeded Foliot in the see of London, with William Longchamp, the chancellor of Richard I, and with Walter de Coutances, the Archbishop of Rouen, gave him excellent opportunities of collecting information.

Writings
Ralph's two chief works, the Abbreviationes chronicorum and the Ymagines historiarum, cover the history of the world from the birth of Christ to the year 1202. The former, which ends in 1147, is a work of learning and industry, but is almost entirely based upon extant sources. The latter, beginning as a compilation from Robert de Monte and the letters of Foliot, becomes an original authority c. 1172 and a contemporary record c. 1181. In precision and fullness of detail the Ymagines are inferior to the chronicles of Roger of Hoveden.

Though an annalist, Ralph is careless in his chronology. The documents which he incorporates, while often important, are selected on no principle. He has little sense of style but displays considerable insight when he ventures to discuss a political situation. For this reason, and on account of the details with which they supplement the more important chronicles of the period, the Ymagines are a valuable though secondary source.

Editions of Diceto's writings
Stubbs, William (ed.). Radulfi de Diceto decani Lundoniensis opera historica. The Historical Works of Master Ralph de Diceto, Dean of London. 2 vols. Rolls Series 68. 1876. The first volume contains editions of the Abbreviationes chronicorum, Capitula ymaginum historiarum and the Ymagines historiarum, with introduction. The second volume (Ymagines, continued, 1180–1202, minor works, and miscellaneous documents appended to the preface) contains minor works which are the barest compendia of facts taken from well-known sources.
Online copy of Volume 1 on Google Books
Online copy of Volume 2 (1876) at Internet Archive.
Hale, W. H. (ed.). The Domesday of St Pauls. Camden Society, 1858. pp. 109 ff. Diceto's fragmentary Domesday of the capitular estates.
Online copy of The Domesday of St Pauls at Internet Archive.

References

Further reading
Duggan, C. and A. Duggan. "Ralph de Diceto, Henry II and Becket." In Authority and Power: Studies on Medieval Law and Government presented to W. Ullmann, ed. by B. Tierneyand P. Linehan. Cambridge, 1980. pp. 59–81. With an appendix on decretal letters.
Gillingham, John. "Historians without hindsight: Coggeshall, Diceto and Howden on the early years of John's reign." In King John: New interpretations, ed. S.D. Church. Woodbridge: Boydell, 1999. pp. 1–26.
Greenway, Diana E. "Succession to Ralph de Diceto, dean of St Paul's." Bulletin of the Institute of Historical Research 39 (1966): 86–95.
Gundermann, Gotthold. "Trogus und Gellius bei Radulfus de Diceto." Leipzig, 1926.
Harrison, Julian. "The English reception of Hugh of Saint-Victor's Chronicle." The Electronic British Library Journal (2002).
McDonald, Richard Blaise. "Diceto, Ralph (c. 1120s-1202)." In Encyclopedia of medieval literature, ed. by R.T. and L.C. Lambdin. Westport, Conn., 2000.
Möhring, Hannes. "Zwei aiyubidische Briefe an Alexander III. und Lucius III. bei Radulf de Diceto zum Kriegsgefangenenproblem." Archiv für Diplomatik 46 (2000): pp. 197–216.
Zinn, G.A. "The influence of Hugh of St Victor's Chronicon on the Abbreviationes Chronicorum of Ralph of Diceto." Speculum 52 (1977): 38–61.
Villegas Aristizabal, L., "Revisión de las crónicas de Ralph de Diceto y de la Gesta regis Ricardi sobre la participación de la flota angevina durante la Tercera Cruzada en Portugal," Studia Historica- Historia Medieval 27 (2009): 153–170.

External links
British Library''

Deans of St Paul's
English chroniclers
12th-century English historians
1120 births
1200s deaths
Year of birth uncertain
Year of death uncertain